Gurdwara Sri Guru Gobind Singh Ghat, also known as Gurudwara Kangan Ghat, is a Sikh place of worship on the banks of the Ganges River approximately  from Takht Sri Patna Sahib. In sikh historical sources, this is the place where Guru Gobind Singh threw his gold bangle (kangan) and passed on the knowledge of Sri Guru Granth Sahib Ji to Pandit Shiv Dutt, a devotee of Sri Ram Chandra.

The ghat is located near Patna Sahib Station in the state of Bihar. It is marked by a gateway with the Gurudwara on top of it.

References

Religious buildings and structures in Patna
Ghats of India
Memorials to Guru Gobind Singh